Orton is an unincorporated community in Gilmer County, in the U.S. state of West Virginia.

History
A post office called Orton was established in 1909, and remained in operation until 1963. The community was named after Orton Mollohan, an early settler.

References

Unincorporated communities in Gilmer County, West Virginia
Unincorporated communities in West Virginia